Tadeusz Olsza (3 December 1895 – 1 June 1975), born Tadeusz Blomberg, was a Polish film and stage actor, cabaret singer, dancer and director born in Warsaw. From 1915 to 1917, he taught vocal classes at Warsaw Conservatory. Starting in 1921 he performed in such Warsaw cabarets and vaudevilles as Stańczyk, Karuzela, Nietoperz (The Bat), Stara Banda, Qui Pro Quo, Perskie Oko, Morskie Oko, Nowości, and Cyruliku Warszawskim. He was known for his parody of Felicjan Sławoj Składkowski, a Polish physician, general and politician.

He performed monologue, satires, revue sketches, vignettes and in musical theater; was also known as a great tango dancer, partnering Loda Halama and her sister Zizi in a hit musical review Tysiąc pięknych dziewcząt (A thousand beautiful girls) and performing with Stanisława Nowicka, "Queen of the Tango."

He began his film career in small roles in German films (Mater Dolorosa and Jugendliebe). In Poland his film appearances included Uwiedziona, Krzyk w nocy, O czym się nie mówi, Głos Serca, Antek Policmajster, Jaśnie pan szofer, and Jego wielka miłość.

Olsza worked in Polish Radio almost from its inception; some of his archived performances are still broadcast.

After the Nazi invasion of Poland he went to Bucharest, Romania, where he joined the group of Polish emigree theater artists. In 1941 he joined the Polish Army in France, then Scotland where he run the theatre for First Brigade of the Polish-Scottish Shooters (see Polish Army in the West).

After the war he returned to Poland where he performed in 1947, first in Kraków, then in Warsaw, as star of the first post-war Polish vaudeville (written by Julian Tuwim): Żołnierz królowej Madagaskaru (Soldier of The Queen Of Madagascar)). In 1948 he played the stages of Buffo and Syrena theaters; he remained with Syrena until his retirement in 1971. In 1972 he left for London, to join his wife, where he died in 1975.

References

External links 
 

1895 births
1975 deaths
Polish male stage actors
Polish male silent film actors
Polish cabaret performers
Polish male film actors
Polish male dancers
20th-century Polish male actors
Male actors from Warsaw
Tango dancers
20th-century comedians